The Dubuque Formation is a geologic formation in Illinois, Iowa, Wisconsin and Minnesota. It preserves fossils dating back to the Ordovician period.

See also 

 List of fossiliferous stratigraphic units in Illinois
 List of fossiliferous stratigraphic units in Iowa
 List of fossiliferous stratigraphic units in Minnesota
 List of fossiliferous stratigraphic units in Wisconsin

References 

Ordovician Minnesota
Ordovician Iowa
Ordovician Illinois
Ordovician geology of Wisconsin
Ordovician southern paleotropical deposits